A campanile is a bell tower.

Campanile may also refer to:

Structures
 Campanile (Iowa State University), Ames, Iowa, US
 Campanile (Trinity College Dublin), Ireland
 Sather Tower or The Campanile, University of California, Berkeley, US
 Leaning Tower of Pisa, Pisa, Italy
 St Mark's Campanile, Venice, Italy

Enterprises and brands
Campanile (restaurant), in Los Angeles, California, US
Campanile, a brand of the Louvre Hôtels chain

Nature
Campanile (gastropod), a genus of large sea snails
Bombino bianco or campanile, a grape variety

Publications
The Campanile, the student newspaper of Mount Saint Joseph Academy in Pennsylvania, US
The Campanile, the student newspaper of Palo Alto High School, California, US
The Campanile, the yearbook of Rice University, Houston, Texas, US

Other uses
Campanile (cake), a traditional Corsican Easter cake
Campanile (surname)
Campanile probe, used in near-field scanning optical microscopy